Kung-Fu Live is an interactive fighting game developed by Virtual Air Guitar Company exclusively for the PlayStation Network.

The game tracks the players movement using the PlayStation Eye and free-motion technology.

It is quoted as being the best of the PlayStation 3 Fitness Games,  "I would say it is a must-have if you’re a fan of fighting games and want to see what the future holds for innovative, creative game design,"

Reception

Kung-Fu Live has received generally mixed reviews. It had an average score of 53.76% at GameRankings, based on 27 reviews and an average score of 50/100 at Metacritic, based on 30 reviews.

Ryan Clements, a writer for IGN who rated the game a 40/100, wrote that the game "has an appealing premise and fun visuals, but I can't recommend a game that left me feeling so defeated."

Steven Williamson, who writes for PSU.com and rated the game a 5.5/10, says "Meet the strict criteria for set-up and calibration and you might enjoy the novelty of seeing yourself kicking ass on screen, but you'll still have to battle with the controls just as much as you will against the bad guys."

References

External links
 Official Webpage
 Developer Webpage

2010 video games
Gamebryo games
Indie video games
Platform games
PlayStation Network games
PlayStation 3 games
PlayStation 3-only games
Video games developed in Finland
Multiplayer and single-player video games